TuS Heeslingen was a German association football club from the town of Heeslingen, Lower Saxony. The footballers were part of a larger sports club that had departments for aerobics, athletics, badminton, bowling, gymnastics, Pilates, table tennis, and volleyball.

History
The roots of the association go back to the 1906 founding of MTV Heeslingen. On 2 February 1946 this club merged with Sportverein Viktoria Heeslingen to form present-day Turn- und Sportverein Heeslingen. The team played as an unheralded local side before breaking into the Verbandsliga Ost Niedesachsen (V) in 1994. The 2006–07 season was one of the most successful for the club as they won promotion to the Oberliga Nord (IV).

The club last played in the tier five Niedersachsen-Liga where it finished fourth in 2012–13 but was refused a licence for the following season and folded. Its place was taken up by a new club, the Heeslinger SC.

Honours
The club's honours:
 Verbandsliga Niedersachsen-Ost
 Champions: 2007

References

External links 
Official team site of Heeslinger SC
Das deutsche Fußball-Archiv historical German domestic league tables (in German)

Defunct football clubs in Germany
Defunct football clubs in Lower Saxony
Association football clubs established in 1906
Association football clubs disestablished in 2013
1906 establishments in Germany
2013 disestablishments in Germany
Football clubs in Germany